Take Me Out is an American dating game show that was broadcast on Fox. It was based on the British show of the same name, which in turn was based on the original Australian show Taken Out and created based on the success of the international versions. The show was hosted by George Lopez. It premiered on June 7, 2012, at 8:00 p.m. in Canada and the United States with ratings of 3.3 million.

On July 3, 2012, Fox announced that the show would be removed from its Thursday night timeslot and be relegated to Saturday nights, starting on July 14, 2012 to make room for Mobbed, but just three days later, following an increase in ratings over the previous episodes, Fox announced that the show would remain in its Thursday night timeslot.

Episodes

 Yellow indicates the bachelor successfully got a date.
 Silver indicates the bachelor failed to get a date.

Ratings

References

2012 American television series debuts
2012 American television series endings
2010s American reality television series
American dating and relationship reality television series
Fox Broadcasting Company original programming
American television series based on Australian television series
American television series based on British television series
Television series by Fremantle (company)